Ayuni D (アユニ・D), born on October 12, 1999, is a Japanese pop singer, member of Japanese girl group Bish, and member of Japanese rock band Pedro. She debuted as a solo artist under the name Aomushi in November 2021.

History
On August 1, 2016, Ayuni was announced as a new member of Bish. Her first album with the group, Killer Bish was released later that year. In 2017, she joined WACK's first shuffle unit Saint Sex as a member alongside fellow Bish member Aina the End. In September 2018, Ayuni debuted as a member of Pedro. In February 2019, Ayuni joined WACK's  third shuffle unit Bully Idol as a member. In October 2021, it was announced that Ayuni would debut as a solo artist under the name Aomushi  (青虫). Her debut EP, was released on November 3.

Discography

Extended plays

References 

1999 births
Living people
Musicians from Sapporo
Japanese women pop singers
Japanese idols